David Hargreaves (born 2 February 1940) is an English actor, commonly seen on television dramas in the 1970s and 1980s set in the north of England, and BBC children's television of the same period.

Early life
Hargreaves was born in New Mills, Derbyshire, and attended Glossop Grammar School (became Glossopdale School in 1965). He trained as a science teacher, at City of Leeds Training College, and at the Central School of Speech and Drama.

Career
Hargreaves worked as a supply teacher at Rising Hill Comprehensive School in Islington, before joining the Royal Shakespeare Company to play in the first The Wars of the Roses Cycle of plays in 1963/65. He played Hotspur in Henry IV part 1 and Leontes in A Winters Tale for the North East Shakespeare Festival run by Joseph O'Connor in 1965, before joining Olivier's National Theatre, appearing in Much Ado about Nothing, Mother Courage, The Crucible, Royal Hunt of the Sun, Love for Love, Othello, The Storm, A Flea in Her Ear and Rosencrantz and Guildenstern are Dead. After an extensive career in repertory theatre, television and radio, he returned to the RSC in 2004 to play Capulet in Romeo and Juliet in Peter Gill's production, and as Gloucester in Bill Alexander's production of King Lear to Corin Redgrave's Lear. Returned to the RSC in 2008/09 to play Baptista Minola in The Taming of the Shrew, directed, by Conal Morrison, and as Man in The Cordelia Dream, written by Marina Carr, directed by Selina Cartmell, for the RSC at Wilton's Music Hall. In 2005 he returned to the National Theatre in a co-production with the Royal Exchange Theatre, Manchester, to play Charlie in On the Shore of the Wide World. In 2011 he played God in Tony Harrison's, The Mysteries, directed by Deborah Bruce, and in 2012 played the King of France/Nym/Erpingham, in Dominic Dromgoole's production of Henry V, both at Shakespeare's Globe. 2015 he played Giles Corey in The Crucible, and in 2016, Gloucester in King Lear, both directed by Tom Morris at the Bristol Old Vic. In 2022 he appeared in Moira Buffini's play,"Manor"at the National Theatre, Lyttleton, directed by Fiona Buffini

Television and Film

  2022, naughty, Your Christmas or mine
  2022, Dalgleish (Series 2), Mr Lorrimer, dir Geoff Sax, New Pictures
  2022, Documentary Now (Season 4), Horace Mc Tierney, dir Rhys Thomas& Alex Buono, Broadway Video
  2022, Flatshare, Mr Prior (series Regular), dir Peter Cattaneo, 42
  2021, A Very British Scandal, Niall, dir Anne Sewitsky, Amazon 
  2019, Flack (Series 2), Warren Armitage, dir. Stephen Moyer, Hat Trick
  2019, Wild Bill, Albert Gilchrist, dir John Hardwick, Shiver & Anonymous
  2019, This Country - 3rd Series, Arthur Andrews,(series regular) dir Tom George, BBC 
 2019, Last Christmas, Arthur, dir. Paul Fieg, Universal Studios
 2019, For Love or Money (2019), Priest, dir. Mark Murphy, Solar Productions
 2019, Warren, Grandad, (series regular) dir. Ben Gosling-Fuller, Hat Trick/BBC
  2018, This Country(Special),Arthur Andrews, dir Tom George, BBC
  2018, Traitors, Martin Garrick (Recurring), Alex Winkler, 42& Twenty Twenty Television/Channel 4
  2018, Fleabag-2nd Series,Chatty Joe, dir Harry Bradbeer BBC/Two Brothers
 2018, This Country-2nd Series, Arthur, dir Tom George, BBC 
 2018, Moving On, Andrew, dir. Adrian Dunbar, LA Productions/BBC tv.Manor
 2018, Doctors, Edwin Wolfe, dir. Christine Ebohan-Green. BBC tv
 2017, Trust Me, Geoff, dir.Amy Neil, Red/BBC tv
 2016, Kotchebi, Ted, dir. In-Sook Chappell, Blank Slate Films Ltd.
 2015, Last Chance, Roger, dir, Steven Chamberlain, Clipstone Productions.(gained special selection for LA Shorts Fest.)
 2014, Borgia III, Fra Cello, dir. Metin Huseyin for Film United;
 2007, Love Letters, Alan, dir Sam Harris for National Film School; 
 2006, Casualty, "All at Sea"-Tommy McArdle, dir. Ben Morris for BBC; 
 2006, The Bill, Brian Warner, dir. Robbie del Maestro for Thames Talkback.
 2005, Heartbeat,"Get Back"- Ernie, dir. Adrian Bean for YTV;
 2001/03, Merseybeat (3 series), Bill Gentle, dir. Ken Horne for BBC; 
 2003, "A Straw in the Wind"- Man, dir. James Callow, Short Film;
 1999, Heartbeat,"Flesh and Blood"- Don Lomax, dir. Paul Walker for YTV;
 1998 "The Passion" (3Parts)- Dave, dir. Catherine Morshead for First Choice productions; 
 1998 Peak Practice, "The Ghost in the Machine"- Charlie Fields, dir. Bill Eagles for Carlton Films; 
 1998 "West Foot Forward, ( 8 Part Documentary), Producer/Deviser-David Hargreaves for HTV; 
 1998, The Bill,"A Peoples Person"- Paul Harvey, dir. Nigel Bristow for Thames TV; 
 1998, Casualty, "Secrets"- Donald Saunders, dir. Michael Morris for BBC;
 1997, Blooming Marvellous (6 eps), Dad, dir. Dewi Humphries for DL Taffler; Bugs, "Identity Crisis" & "Happy Ever After"- Anthony Fairchild, dir. John Stroud for Carnival Films;
 1996, Pie in the Sky, "Return Match"-Charlie Reeves, dir. Rob Evans for Select TV; 
 1996 The Bill, Out of Control"- Alan Robinson, dir. Ian White for Thames TV; 
 1996 Beck, O'Rielly, dir James Hazeldene for BBC;
 1995, Expert Witness, "A Family Man"-Det. Sup. David Doxey, dir. Terry Ireland for LWT; 
 1995 Some Kind of Life, John Taylor, dir. Julian Jarrold for Granada TV; 
 1996 Hetty Wainthropp Investigates, "Eye Witness"-Picture Editor, dir. John Glenister for BBC; 
 1994, Casualty, "End of the Road"-Dennis Martin, dir. David Innes Edwards for BBC; 
 1994 The Bill "Hot off the Press"-Jack Brigson dir. Anthony Quinn for Thames/Talkback;
 1993, Peak Practice, Rev. Neil Winters dir. Moira Armstrong for Central TV; 
 1994 Earthfast, Dr Wix, dir. Marilyn Fox for BBC; 
 1994 Ruth Rendell, "Vanity Dies Hard"-Mr Feast, dir Alan Grint for Blue Heaven Productions; 
 1993 Harry, MadAxeman, dir. Martin Stellman for Union Pictures; 
 1993 Fighting for Jemma, Dr Phillip Dale, dir. Jullian Jarrold for Granada TV; 
 1993 The Bill, "Missing"-Alan Slater, dir. Roger Gartland for Thames TV; 
 1993 Alleyn Mysteries, "Death at the Bar"-Super.Int. Harper, dir. Michael Winterbottom for BBC;
 1992, The Tempest, Alonso, for BBC Disability Unit; The Mendip Mysteries, Lou Clarke, dir. Pennant Roberts for HTV; Heartbeat, "Rumours"-Pendleton, dir. James Ormerod for YTV;
 1991, "Josie"-Gradgrind, dir. Geoff Posner for Pozitive Productions;  
 1991 "Woof"-Doctor, dir. David Cobham for Thames TV; 
 1991 "Thatcher the Final Days"-Charles Powell, dir. Tim Sullivan for Granada TV;
 1990, "Kingdom Come, Wayne", dir. Bob Blagden for BBC; 
 1990 "The Conversion of St Paul, Blue Man", dir. Bob Blagden for BBC;
 1989, "Tecx", editor, dir. Laurence Gordon Clarke for Central TV; 
 1990 "A Strike Out of Time"- Arthur Scargill, dir. Paul Bryers for Brook Productions;  
 1990 "Madly in Love"- Desk Sergeant, dir. Ross Devenish for Shaker Films; 
 1990 Poirot-  Sergeant, dir. Richard Spence for LWT; 
 1989 All Creatures Great and Small, "Mending Fences" dir. Mike Brayshaw for BBC;  
 1989 "She's Been Away"- Lilian's Doctor, dir. Peter Hall for BBC Films.
 1988/89, "Making Out" (2 series), Colin, prod. John Chapman for BBC; 
 1988, "No Further Cause for Concern", Governor, dir. John Bruce for BBC; 
 1988 "Erasmus Microman"- Michael Faraday, dir David Richards for Granada TV; 
 1987 Truckers, "Shoot if you'll pardon my French" dir. Laurence Moody for BBC;  
 1988 "Closing Ranks"- Doctor, dir. Roger Graef for Zenith Films; 
 1986, "1914 All Out", Tom Houghton, dir. David Greene for Yorkshire TV;
 1985/86, "Albion Market" (80 Eps.), Derek Owen, prod., Gareth Jones for Granada TV;
 1985, "Pie in the Sky" (Children's Series), -Presenter, dir. Sharon Miller, (from an idea by David Hargreaves/Chloe Ashcroft/Peter Gosling), for BBC; 
 1985, Shine on Harvey Moon, "Anything Goes"-Sgt. Singer, for Central TV; 
 1985 "Home to Roost", dir. David Reynolds for YTV;
 1984, "The Sea Green Man" for Thames TV; 
 1983, "Shades of Darkness: The Intercessor"- Fanshaw, dir. Peter Smith for Granada TV; 
 1980 "Together" dir. Matthew Robinson for Southern TV;  
 1980 "Mistress Masham's Repose", dir Eugene Ferguson for Granada TV;
 1982, "Minder"- 'Back in Good Old England'- Archie Simpson, dir. Francis Megahy for Thames TV;
 1982, "For Ever Young" Brother-in-law, dir. Roy Battersby for Central TV; 
 1981/82, "Science Workshop"- Presenter, dir. Michael Coyle for BBC Education Dept.;
 1981/82, "Sorry I'm a Stranger here Myself",(2 Series), Tom Pratt, dir. Tony Parker for Thames TV;  
 1981/82, "Juliet Bravo", (22 eps), Tom Darblay, prod. Terrence Williams for BBC;
 1981, "Jackanory" -Presenter, BBC; 
 1980, Cribb " The Detective Wore Silk Drawers"- Robert D'Estin, dir. Alan Grint for Granada TV; 
 1980 "Leap in the Dark,-Poor Jenny"-Dr Bushnell;
 1979,  "Agatha"- Sgt. Jarvis, dir. Michael Apted for First Artists Productions; 
 1980 "Minor Complications", -David, dir. Moira Armstrong for BBC Play for Today; 
 1977 "Stronger than the Sun"-John, dir. Michael Apted for BBC Play for Today; 
 1977 "The Cost of Loving" dir. James Ormerod for YTV; 
 1972 "Home and Away", dir. Roy Battersby for BBC;  
 1972 "A Life is Forever"-Peters, dir Alan Clarke for BBC 
 1971 Play for Today (Ep 43); "Sweet England's Pride";   
 1970 "The Worker" (Charlie Drake Series)- 2nd feed, for ATV;  
 1978/79 "Playschool"-Presenter, prod. Cynthia Felgate for BBC Children's TV; 
 1979, "A Brother's Tale", dir. Les Chatfield for Granada TV; 
 1977 "Coronation Street", Mr Birchell, dir. Matthew Robinson for Granada TV;
 1978/79, "Strangers"-DCI Rainbow (11 Eps.) for Granada;
 1978, The Professionals "Not a Very Civil Servant"- Halloran for Euston Films; 
 1978 The Standard, "Two Birds one Stone"; 
 1978 Armchair Thriller, "A Dog's Ransom",( 3 Eps.) dir. Donald McWhinnie for Thames TV;
 1977, "The XYY Man"(2 Eps),-Shane Wentworth, for Granada TV; 
 1977 "Headmaster"(5 Eps) dir. Roland Joffé for BBC;  
 1977 This Year Next Year, "Haytime"- Randall for Granada TV; 
 1976, When the Boat comes In, "Roubles for the Promised Land",- Green berg, dir. Michael Hayes for BBC;
 1975, Crown Court, "Never on Saturdays, Never on Sundays"- Morris Downing for Granada TV; 
 1975 Oil Strike North, "Storm Clouds"- Henderson for BBC; 
 1975 Centre Play, "Post Morton"- Caller; 
 1975 The Sweeney, "Night Out"- Det. Sgt. Jellyneck, for Euston Films;
 1973, Softly, Softly, "Conspiracy"- Carter, for BBC; 
 1973 Crown Court, "Conduct Prejudicial"- Squadron Leader Davis for Granada TV; 
 1973 Crown Court, "There was a Little Girl"- Gilbert Brinsley, for Granada TV; 
 1973 The Adventurer "Mr Calloway Is a Very Cautious Man- Russel;
 1972, "The Visitors" (6 Eps.),- Herbert Wragg dir. Ronnie Wilson for BBC; 
 1972 The Brothers, "Full Circle"- Reynolds, for BBC;  
 1972 Callan, "If He Can, So Can I",- Harris for Thames TV;  
 1972 "Clouds of Witness",- George Goyles for BBC;
 1971, Elizabeth R" "Sweet England's Pride"- Bolingbroke, dir. James Cellan Jones for BBC;  
 1971 Softly Softly, "The Bounty Hunter",- Lawrence Morgan for BBC;  
 1970, Roads to Freedom (2 Eps), dir. James Cellan Jones for BBC; 
 1969, The Expert, "Dependence" (2 Eps)- Harry, dir. Ronnie Wilson for BBC;
 1969, The First Lady, "And They Call That Progress" for BBC;  
 1969 Z Cars, "Welcome to Newtown" (2 Eps)- Pilot, dir. Shaun Sutton for BBC;  
 1969 Callan, "The Most Promising Girl of her Year"- Karl Donner dir. Peter Duguid for Thames TV;
 1968, The Expert, "And So Say All of Us",- Sgt. Cook for BBC
 1967;  Z Cars, "Sauce for the Goose",- Roy Cooper for BBC;
 1965, "Othello", Herald, dir. Stuart Burge for BHE Films/National Theatre of Great Britain;
 1963, Z Cars, "The Listeners",- Mechanic for BBC ;  
 1962 Last Man Out, (6 Eps.), dir. Shaun Sutton for BBC.

Theatre
  2022,   "Manor",  Rev.Fiske, dir Fiona Buffini, National Theatre
 2016,  "King Lear", Gloucester, dir, Tom Morris, Bristol Old Vic. 2015,  
  2016    "The Crucible", Giles Corey, dir. Tom Morris, Bristol Old Vic.                    
  2014.   Henry V, The King of France/Nym/Erpingham, dir.    Dominic Dromgoole for Shakespeare's Globe;
 2011, The Globe Mysteries by Tony Harrison, God, dir. Deborah Bruce for Shakespeare's Globe.
 2010, Inheritance, Harry, dir. Lisa Goldman for Live Theatre, Newcastle.
 2009, Pub Quiz is Life, Bunny, dir. Gareth Tudor Price for Hull Truck Theatre Co.
 2008, The Taming of the Shrew, Baptista Minola, dir. Conal Morrison for Royal Shakespeare Co.
 2008/09 The Cordelia Dream, Man, dir. Selina Cartmel for RSC at Wilton's Music Hall.
 2007, Puntilla and his Man Matti", Puntilla, dir. Hamish Glenn for Belgrade Theatre, Coventry.
 2006, The Worcester Pilgrim, Pilgrim, dir. Peter Leslie Wilde for Worcester Cathedral.
 2005, The Hypochondriac, Argente, dir. Hamish Glenn for Belgrade Theatre, Coventry.
 2005, On the Shore of the Wide World, Charlie Holmes, dir. Sarah Francom for National Theatre/Royal Exchange Theatre, Manchester.
 2004/05, King Lear, Gloucester, dir. Bill Alexander for RSC Stratford/Albery Theatre, London. 2004/05, Romeo and Juliet, Capulet, dir Peter Gill for RSC Stratford/Albery Theatre, London.
 2004, Pilate, Caiaphas, dir. Michael Boyd for RSC Studio, Stratford.
 2000/01, Hamlet, Polonius, dir. Bill Alexander for Birmingham Rep and Tour.
 2000, Twelfth Night, Feste, dir. Bill Alexander for Birmingham Rep.
 2000, Quarantine, Aphas, dir. Bill Alexander for Birmingham Rep.
 1999, The Four Alice Bakers, Prof. Richard Baker, dir Bill Alexander for Birmingham Rep.
 1999, All That Trouble That We Had", Vaughan, dir. Tony Clarke for Birmingham Rep.
 1998, Kafka's Dick, Herman, dir. Phillip Franks for Nottingham Playhouse.
 1997, Lavochkin 5, Seryozha, dir. Irina Brown for Tron Theatre, Glasgow.
 1996, Season's Greetings,Harvey, dir. Gwenda Hughes for Birmingham Rep.
 1996, The Changing Room, Thornton, dir. James MacDonald for Royal Court Theatre at Duke of York's, London and Tour.
 1995, Casement, Basil Thompson, dir. Corin Redgrave for Moving Theatre at Riverside Studios.
 1995, The Fire Raisers, Chorus, dir. Lenka Udevicki for Moving Theatre at Riverside Studios.
 1995, Anthony and Cleopatra, Lepidus/Dolabella, dir. Vanessa Redgrave for Moving Theatre at Riverside Studios/World Tour.
 1993, A Passionate Woman, Donald, dir. David Liddament for West Yorkshire Playhouse.
 1993, Raising Hell, Alastair Crowley, dir. Les Miller for Inner City Theatre at the Old Red Lion.
 1992, A View from the Bridge, Eddie Carbone, dir. Michael Napier Brown for Royal Theatre, Northampton.
 1991, Twelfth Night, Antonio, dir. Peter Hall for Triumph Productions Playhouse Theatre, London/Tour.
 1990, Is This the Day, Derek Humphries, dir. Michael Napier Brown for Theatre Royal, Northampton.
 1989, Stoppard's 15 Minute Hamlet, dir. David Hargreaves for "Save the Rose Theatre", Bankside.
 1989, Chekhov's Women, Ivan/Vershinin, dir. Vanessa Tedgrave/David Hargreaves for Moving Theatre at Lyric Theatre, Hammersmith.
 1988, A Doll's House, Krogstadt, dir. Jan Sargeant for Riverside Studios.
 1988, The Father, The Captain, dir. Patrick Stanford for Redgrave Theatre, Farnham.
 1987, Happy Jack, Jack, dir.Janet Henfry for Islington Touring.
 1984, A View from the Bridge, Alfieri, dir. Roger Smith for Young Vic Theatre.
 1983, A Passion in Six Days, Glint, dir. Michael Boyd for Crucible Theatre, Sheffield.
 1982, Devour the Snow, Sutter, dir. Simon Curtis for Bush Theatre.
 1982, The Best Girl in Ten Streets, Interrogator, dir. Tamara Hinchco for Soho Poly.
 1980, It's a Mad House, Eddie, dir. Michael Attenborough for Leeds Playhouse.
 1979, Wednesday", Arthur, dir. Dusty Hughes, for Bush Theatre.
 1972, Landscape of Exile, Aveling, dir. Roland Rees for Foco Novo at the Half Moon.
 1971, Subject for Interrogation/Agentic Shift, Colonel/Joe, dir. John Chapman for Bush Theatre.
 1970, The Recruiting Officer, Plume, dir Tony Carrick for Hornchurch Rep.
 1970, The Roaring Girl, Trapdoor, dir. Keith Darville for Dundee Rep.
 1969 Saint joan, Cauchon, dir. George Roman for Billingham Forum Theatre.
 1968, Not Now Darling, Ron, dir. Patrick Cargill for Michael White at the Strand Theatre.
 1965/67, National Theatre at the Old Vic. Mother Courage, Catholic Sergeant/ Lieutenant, dir. Bill Gaskill. Othello, Herald, dir. John Dexter. Much Ado about Nothing, Borachio, dir Franco Zeffirelli/Robert Stephens. Love for Love, Foresight's Servant, dir. Peter Wood. 'The Storm, Citizen, dir John Dexter. Juno and the Paycock, Neighbour, dir. Laurence Olivier.A Flea in Her Ear, Neighbour, dir. Jaqyes Charon. Rosencranz and Guildenstern are Dead, Horatio, dir. Derek Goldby.
 1965, Henry VI part 1 Hotspur, dir. Tony Carrick, for North East Shakespeare Festival at Sunderland Empire.
 1965, The Winters Tale, Leontes, dir Joseph O'Connor for North East Shakespeare Festival at Sunderland Empire.
 1963/65, Royal Shakespeare Company at Memorial Theatre Stratford/Aldwych Theatre London. "The Lower Middle Class Wedding Party", Bridegroom, dir Sandy Black. Conference Hall Studio  Three Sisters, Solyony, dir. Frank Evans. Conference Hall Studio Richard III, Norfolk, dir. Peter Hall/John Barton.   Richard II, Bushey, dir. Peter Hall/John Barton. Henry VI, Assorted Soldiers, Citizens, dir. Peter Hall/ John Barton/Peter Wood.

Radio
  2021, The Tempest, Prospero, dir Sean Hagarty, Shakespeare@
  2021, Richard II, John O'Gaunt dir Sean Hagarty, Shakespeare@
 2019, The Archers - Alf Grundy, BBC R4
 2012, The Archers – Arthur, prod. Julie Beckett BBC R4; Together- Reader, prod. Andrew Barnes  BBC R4; Truman and Riley – Charlie, prod. Toby Swift, BBC R4;
 2010, The Ladies Delight- Narrator, prod. Charlotte Riches, Woman's Hour Serial BBC R4; The Archers – Joseph Hastings, Editor Vanessa Whitburn, BBC R4;  Siege – Jack, prod. Susan Roberts BBC R4; The Journey – Alan, prod. Nadia Molinari BBC R4;
 2009, Boswell's Life of Johnson – Garrick/King George, prod. Claire Groves BBC R4;  Choice of Straws – Dad, prod. Claire Groves, BBC R4;  Edward II – Lancaster/Matrevis prod. Jessica Dromgoole BBC R4; From Fact to Fiction: Parliament of Rooks- Poet, prod. Peter Leslie Wilde, BBC R4; How are you Feeling Alf -Michael, prod. Peter Kavanagh BBC R4; Incident at Boulonvilliers – Arthur, prod. David Hunter BBC R4; Leaving:Vaclav Havel – Oswald Knobloch, prod., Marion Nancarrow, BBC R4; Rappacinni's Daughter – Baglioni, prod. Abigal le Fleming BBC R4; The Hairy Ape – Guard, prod. Toby Swift, BBC R4; The Last Tsar – Lord Stanfordham, prod. Jeremy Mortimer BBC R4; The Long Room- Reader prod. Laurence Grissel, BBC R4; The Looking Glass War – Woodford, prod. Marc Beeby BBC R4; The Milk Race – Fox Man, prod. Toby Swift, BBC R4; Tinker Taylor Soldier Spy, – Roy Bland prod. Steven Canny BBC R$; Towards Zero – Treeves prod. Mary Peate BBC R4;
 2008, Look Sharp – Ted, prod. Nadia Molinari BBC R4;
 2007, Second Chance – Jim, prod. Nadia Molinari BBC R4;
 2006 Tin Man – Grandad/Tinker prod. Nadia Molinari BBC R4; Out of Season – George, prod Carrie Rooney BBC R4; Heft Like the Herdwick – Thomas, prod Nadia Molinari BBC R4; Alf Said I was Great – Len, prod Peter Leslie Wilde BBC R4; GBA were M'esin – The Man, prod. Polly James BBC R4; Good Times Roll – Guy, prod. Steven Canny, BBC R3;
 2005, Gunpowder Women – Father Garnet, prod. BBC R4; The Waterloo Model – Narrator prod. Peter Lelie Wilde BBC R4; Portrait – Phil, prod. David Hunter BBC R4;
 2004, The English Garden – Poetry Reader, prod. Gabi Fisher BBC R4;
 2003, The Worcester Pilgrim – William Sutton, prod. Vanessa Whiitburn/Peter Leslie Wilde BBC R4;
 2002, Scrooge Blues – Ebenezer Scrooge, prod. Peter Leslie Wilde BBC R4; The Really Rough Holiday Guide – Old Tom, prod. Sally Avens BBC R4; Glorious John – John, prod. Peter Leslie Wilde BBC R4;
 2001, The Tailor of Gloucester – The Tailor, prod, Jonquil Ponting BBC R4; The Rainbow Bridge – David Williams, prod. Peter Leslie Wilde BBC R4;

Personal life
He married in 1966 in Buckinghamshire, meeting his wife, Chloe Ashcroft, at the National Theatre. They live in Whiteshill and Ruscombe in Gloucestershire and have a son (born 1968) and daughter (born April 1971).

References

External links
 
 Portrait

1940 births
Alumni of Leeds Beckett University
Alumni of the Royal Central School of Speech and Drama
English male stage actors
English male television actors
Living people
Male actors from Derbyshire
People from New Mills
Schoolteachers from Derbyshire